Bala Seyyed Kola (also Romanized as Bālā Seyyed Kolā; also known as Seyyed Kolā-ye Bālā) is a village in Gatab-e Jonubi Rural District, Gatab District, Babol County, Mazandaran Province, Iran. At the 2006 census, its population was 139, in 37 families.

References 

Populated places in Babol County